Cross chess is a chess variant invented by George R. Dekle Sr. in 1982. The game is played on a board comprising 61 cross-shaped cells, with players each having an extra rook, knight, and pawn in addition to the standard number of chess pieces.

Cross chess was included in World Game Review No. 10 edited by Michael Keller.

Hexagonal features
The cross chess board geometry has the same features as hexagon-based chessboards; however, diagonals and ranks are defined differently in cross chess from Gliński's and Shafran's hexagonal variants, resulting in move possibilities more akin to standard chess. As with hex-based boards, three cell colors are used, but same-color cells highlight horizontal ranks on the cross chess board, not diagonals.

Game rules
The diagram shows the starting setup. Special rank and diagonal paths determine how pieces move, as described below. Check, checkmate, and stalemate are as in standard chess. However a pawn has no initial two-step option, and a rook can make a one-step diagonal move.

Piece moves
 A bishop moves along diagonals – adjoining cells in straight lines 33.69 degrees from the horizontal. (Four possible directions.)
 A rook moves vertically along files (two directions) and horizontally (two directions) along ranks – cells of the same color in a horizontal line. In addition, a rook may make a one-step diagonal move.
 The queen moves as a rook and bishop. (Eight directions.)
 The king moves one step as a queen. In each case the king shifts to the cell occupied by the castling rook, with the rook shifting to the cell on opposite side and adjacent to the king. Normal castling conventions apply.
 A knight moves in the pattern: one step on a file or rank, then one step diagonally outward. (Or vice versa: one step diagonally, then one step on a file or rank in an outward direction.) A knight leaps any intervening men.
 A pawn moves one step straight forward on a file, with no initial two-step option. A pawn captures one step diagonally forward. Promotion occurs at the furthest cell on a file.

See also
 Hexagonal chess
 Also by George Dekle:
 Masonic chess
 Triangular chess – a variant using a hexagonal board with triangular cells
 Hexshogi – a shogi variant with hexagonal cells

Notes

References

Bibliography

Chess variants
1982 in chess
Board games introduced in 1982